The Navy was a magazine published by the Navy League of Great Britain from 1909 until 1971.

References 
The Navy : (a monthly review of naval & mercantile affairs), OCLC.

1909 establishments in the United Kingdom
1971 disestablishments in the United Kingdom
Defunct magazines published in the United Kingdom
English-language magazines
Magazines published in London
Magazines established in 1909
Magazines disestablished in 1971